Joe Angelino is an American politician and law enforcement officer serving as a member of the New York State Assembly from the 122nd district. Elected in November 2020, he assumed office on January 6, 2021.

Background 
Angelino was born in Norwich, New York. He served as a member of the United States Marine Corps from 1985 to 2008 and later worked for the Norwich Police Department, retiring as chief of police. Angelino was elected to the New York State Assembly in November 2020 and assumed office on January 6, 2021.

References 

Living people
People from Norwich, New York
Republican Party members of the New York State Assembly
1959 births